Abdul Quddus is a male Muslim given name. It is built from the Arabic words Abd, al- and Quddus. The name means "Servant of the Holy One", Al-Quddus. 

The letter a of the al- is unstressed, and can be transliterated by almost any vowel, often by u. The last element may appear as Quddous, Qudus or in other ways, with the whole name subject to variable spacing and hyphenation. 

It may refer to:
Abdul Quddus Gangohi (1456–1537), Indian Sufi poet
Ihsan Abdel Quddous (1919–1990), Egyptian writer, novelist, and journalist
Abdul Qudus, Afghan, former Guantanamo detainee (ISN 929)
Isa Abdul-Quddus, Detroit Lions safety

References

Arabic masculine given names